John W. Creighton Jr. (September 1, 1932 - January 29, 2020) was an American executive who served for nine years, from 1988 to 1997, as president and chief executive officer of Weyerhaeuser, a $7 billion, publicly traded timber company. In addition to Weyerhaeuser, he also served in senior management and executive positions with United Airlines, the University of Puget Sound, the U.S. Department of the Army, and the Boy Scouts of America.

Education
Creighton earned a B.S. from Ohio State University in 1954, a LLB from Ohio State in 1957, and an MBA from the Miami Herbert Business School at the University of Miami. Creighton was also a certified public accountant.

Career
Creighton served as president and chief executive officer of Weyerhaeuser Company from 1988 through 1997. He was the first chair of Weyerhaeuser who was not a member of the Weyerhaeuser family. He also served as chairman and chief executive officer of UAL Corporation, the parent company of United Airlines.

Civic work
Creighton earned the Eagle Scout rank from the Boy Scouts of America (BSA) in 1946. As an adult, he was recognized for outstanding career and civic work by the BSA and awarded their Distinguished Eagle Scout Award. From 1997 to 1998, he served as the national president of the BSA. As national president, Creighton emphasized Scouting's traditional values and supported the growth of the BSA. Creighton said, "Scouting has always reflected the expectations of the American family. That so many American parents have chosen to involve their children in Scouting is a powerful testament to Scouting's effectiveness in building character in American youth."

Personal
Creighton served in the U.S. Army. Prior to his death in 2020, at the age of 87, he served on the board of directors of Saltchuk, a transportation and distribution company. He was married had three children and at the time of his death two grandchildren.  His son and namesake John W. Creighton III served as a commissioner of the Port of Seattle.

Footnotes

References

1932 births
2020 deaths
University of Miami Business School alumni
Ohio State University alumni
Ohio State University Moritz College of Law alumni
American chief executives
Presidents of the Boy Scouts of America